Electoral district of King may refer to:

 Electoral district of King (New South Wales), a former electorate of the New South Wales Legislative Assembly
 Electoral district of King (South Australia), an electorate of the South Australian House of Assembly since 2018